Cihan University is an educational institution in Erbil, capital of the autonomous Kurdistan Region of Iraq.  It was established in 2007 by the A University Company for Scientific Investment which is a part of Cihan Group. Cihan is the first private university in the Kurdistan Region.  A is accredited by the Ministry of Higher Education and Scientific Research of Kurdistan and it is a member of the Association of Arab Universities Union (AARU).

Cihan university students, faculty and staff study, work and live on three campuses: Erbil, Sulaymaniyah, and Duhok. In 2014, the university offered courses in 12 departments.

In 2011, a campus of Cihan University in Sulaimaniya was approved by the Kurdish Ministry of Higher Education and Scientific Research (Reference Number: N302, 12-May-2011, KRG).

In 2017, Cihan University-Erbil obtained full accreditation from the Iraqi Ministry of Higher Education and Scientific Research.

References

 Association of Arab Universities union

Universities in Kurdistan Region (Iraq)
Buildings and structures in Erbil
Educational institutions established in 2007
2007 establishments in Iraqi Kurdistan
Erbil
Universities in Iraq